Excuses for Travellers is the third album by Mojave 3, released by 4AD on 15 May 2000 in the UK and 5 September 2000 in the US. It features the singles "In Love with a View," "Any Day Will Be Fine," and "Return to Sender." The album was released to generally positive reviews. At Metacritic, which assigns a normalized rating out of 100 to reviews from mainstream critics, the album has received an average score of 77, based on 15 reviews.

Track listing

Singles
 "In Love with a View" (3 April 2000)
 7" vinyl, TAD 2K03
 "In Love with a View"
 "Prayer for the Paranoid" (electric version)
 "Any Day Will Be Fine" (1 May 2000)
 CD single, BAD 2K04CD; 7" vinyl, AD 2K04
 "Any Day Will Be Fine"
 "Krazy Koz"
 "Always Right"
 "Return to Sender" (11 September 2000)
 CD single, BAD 2K17CD; 7" vinyl, AD 2K17
 "Return to Sender"
 "Yer Feet" (Live with Portuguese fireworks)
 "Girl from the North Country"

References

2000 albums
Mojave 3 albums
4AD albums